The 1998 Western Kentucky Hilltoppers football team represented Western Kentucky University in the 1998 NCAA Division I-AA football season and were led by All-American quarterback Willie Taggart and head coach Jack Harbaugh. This would be the team’s last year as an independent, the next year they would rejoin the Ohio Valley Conference as a football only member.  The Hilltoppers primarily ran an option offense and were ranked 3rd in rush offense for NCAA Division I-AA.  They missed returning to the NCAA Playoffs and finished the season ranked 19th in final 1AA postseason national poll.

Western Kentucky's roster included future NFL players Joseph Jefferson, Rod “He Hate Me” Smart, and Ben Wittman.  Patrick Goodman, Andy Hape, and Taggart were named to the AP All American team and Taggart was also named I-AA Independent Offensive Player of the Year.  The I-AA Independent All-Star Team included Goodman, Hape, Taggart, Delvechio Walls, Bryan Daniel, and Trae Hackett.

Schedule

References

Western Kentucky
Western Kentucky Hilltoppers football seasons
Western Kentucky Hilltoppers football